"" is the national anthem of Gabon. Written and composed by politician Georges Aleka Damas, it was adopted upon independence in 1960.

History 
In a speech in Port-Gentil on 15 March 1962, President Léon M'ba stated his intention to have the national anthem translated into the various Gabonese dialects "so that in the remotest village in the country everyone will be able to understand its meaning."

Lyrics

French lyrics

Translations

Notes

References

External links
 Gabon: La Concorde - Audio of the national anthem of Gabon, with information and lyrics (archive link)

Gabonese music
National symbols of Gabon
African anthems
Year of song missing
National anthem compositions in F major
1960 songs